María José is a female given name.

María José may also refer to:

 María José (1978 TV series)
 María José (1995 TV series)
  (1928–2020), Portuguese actress who owned a restaurant that once employed Ana Gomes
 María José (singer) (born 1976), Mexican singer and dancer
María José (album), her debut album
María José (EP), an EP by María José Castillo